Karacaoğlu can refer to the following villages in Turkey:

 Karacaoğlu, Bartın
 Karacaoğlu, Taşköprü